HMS M2 was a Royal Navy submarine monitor completed in 1919, converted in 1927 into a submarine aircraft carrier. She was wrecked in Lyme Bay, Dorset, Britain, on 26 January 1932. She was one of three M-class boats completed.

Design and career
Four M-class submarines replaced the order for the last four K-class submarines, K17-K21. Although they were similar in size, the M class was an entirely different design from the K class, although it is possible that some material ordered for the K-boats went into them. In any event, the end of the First World War meant that only three were completed.

M2 was laid down at Vickers shipyard at Barrow in Furness in 1916, and launched in 1918. Like the other members of her class, she was armed with a single fixed 12-inch (305mm) gun as well as torpedo tubes. The Mark IX gun was taken from spares held for the Formidable-class battleships.

They were designed to operate as submarine monitors or cruisers. They displaced  on the surface and  when submerged. Two 12-cylinder diesel engines producing  drove them on the surface; underwater, they were driven by electric motors producing .

Her 12-inch gun was removed, replaced by a small aircraft hangar, the work being completed in 1927. This could carry a small Parnall Peto seaplane, specially designed for the M2, which, once its wings had been unfolded, could be lowered onto the sea alongside by a derrick for take off. On landing, the aircraft was hoisted back onto the deck and replaced into the hangar. In October 1928, a hydraulic aircraft catapult was fitted, to enable the seaplane to take off directly from the deck. The submarine was intended to operate ahead of the battle fleet in a reconnaissance role, flying off her unarmed seaplane as a scout.

Accident
M2 left her base at Portland on 26 January 1932, for an exercise in West Bay, Dorset, carrying Parnall Peto serial N255. Her last communication was a radio message at 10:11 to her submarine depot ship, to announce that she would dive at 10:30. The captain of a passing merchant ship, the Newcastle coaster Tynesider, mentioned that he had seen a large submarine dive stern first at around 11:15. Unaware of the significance of this, he only reported it in passing once he reached port.

Her entire crew of 60 was killed in the accident. The submarine was found on 3 February, eight days after her loss. Ernest Cox, the salvage expert who had raised the German battleships at Scapa Flow, was hired to salvage the M2. In an operation lasting nearly a year and 1,500 dives, on 8 December 1932, she was lifted to within  of the surface before a gale sprang up, sending her down to her final resting place.

The hangar door was found open and the aircraft still in it. The accident was believed to be due to water entering the submarine through the hangar door, which had been opened to launch the aircraft shortly after surfacing.

Two explanations have been advanced. The first is that since the crew were always trying to beat their record time for launching the aircraft, they had opened the hangar door on surfacing while the deck was still awash. The other theory is that the flooding of the hangar was due to failure of the stern hydroplanes. High pressure air tanks were used to bring the boat to the surface in an awash condition, but to conserve compressed air compressors were then started to completely clear the ballast tanks of water by blowing air into them. This could take as long as 15 minutes to complete. The normal procedure for launching the aircraft was therefore to hold the boat on the surface using the hydroplanes whilst the hangar door was opened and the aircraft launched. Failure of the stern hydroplanes would have sent the stern down as observed by the merchant officers and water would have eventually entered the hangar.

Aftermath
She is a popular dive for scuba divers. The wreck is designated as a "protected place" under the Protection of Military Remains Act 1986.

After the loss of M2, the Royal Navy abandoned submarine-launched aircraft, although other navies experimented with the concept in the inter-war years and with Japan producing some 42 submarine aircraft carriers both before and during the Second World War.

See also

I-400-class submarine

References

Bibliography

 Brown, D.K. (2003) The Grand Fleet: Warship Design and Development 1906-1922, London: Caxton Editions, 
 Treadwell, T.C. (1999) Strike from beneath the Sea: a history of aircraft-carrying submarines, Stroud, UK: Tempus Publishing. 
 SI 2008/0950 Designation under the Protection of Military Remains Act

External links

 Gulls of War, October 1931 article Popular Mechanics
 "Sub Launches Plane With Catapult", October 1931, Popular Science

British M-class submarines
Ships built in Barrow-in-Furness
1918 ships
World War I submarines of the United Kingdom
Submarine aircraft carriers
Maritime incidents in 1932
British submarine accidents
Warships lost with all hands
Shipwrecks in the English Channel
Protected Wrecks of the United Kingdom
Wreck diving sites in the United Kingdom
1932 disasters in the United Kingdom